The 2021 Asian Men's Club Volleyball Championship  was the eleventh edition of the Asian Men's Club Volleyball Championship, an annual international volleyball club tournament organized by the Asian Volleyball Confederation (AVC) with Thailand Volleyball Association (TVA). The tournament was held in Nakhon Ratchasima, Thailand, from 8 to 15 October 2021. The champions qualified for the 2021 FIVB Volleyball Men's Club World Championship.

The last edition was held in 2019. A tournament was supposed to be held in 2020 in Nakhon Ratchasima, Thailand but was cancelled due to the COVID-19 pandemic.

Qualification
Following the AVC regulations, The maximum of 16 teams in all AVC events will be selected by
1 team for the host country
10 teams based on the final standing of the previous edition
5 teams from each of 5 zones (with a qualification tournament if needed)

Qualified associations

 Thailand as host country is entitled to enter two teams if they are less than 16 entrants. Their two berths are credited to have been attained as host nation and tenth placers in the 2019 championships.
 As Thailand already qualified as host, a berth was given to Kazakhstan through their eleventh place finishing of the 2019 championship.

Squads

Participating teams
The following teams were entered for the tournament.

Draw
The draw was held on 3 August 2021 in Bangkok, Thailand.

Pool standing procedure
 Number of matches won
 Match points
 Sets ratio
 Points ratio
 If the tie continues as per the point ratio between two teams, the priority will be given to the team which won the last match between them. When the tie in points ratio is between three or more teams, a new classification of these teams in the terms of points 1, 2 and 3 will be made taking into consideration only the matches in which they were opposed to each other.

Match won 3–0 or 3–1: 3 match points for the winner, 0 match points for the loser
Match won 3–2: 2 match points for the winner, 1 match point for the loser

Venues
Matches will be held at the Terminal Hall – Terminal 21 Korat, an indoor arena within the Terminal 21

Preliminary round
All times are Indochina Time (UTC+07:00).

Pool A

|}

|}

Pool B

|}

|}

Final round
All times are Indochina Time (UTC+07:00).

 
9th–10th places

9th place match

|}

5th–8th places

5th–8th semifinals

|}

7th place match

|}

5th place match

|}

Final four

Semifinals

|}

3rd place match

|}

Final

|}

Final standing

Awards

Most Valuable Player
 Saber Kazemi (Foolad Sirjan)
Best Setter
 Georgiev Borislav (Al Arabi)
Best Outside Spikers
 Konstantin Čupković (Al Arabi)
 Vitaliy Vorivodin (Burevestnik Almaty)

Best Middle Blockers
 Mahdi Jelveh (Foolad Sirjan)
 Nodirkhan Kadirkhanov (Burevestnik Almaty)
Best Opposite Spiker
 Felipe Bandero (Al Arabi)
Best Libero
 Tanapat Charoensuk (Nakhon Ratchasima QminC)

See also
2021 Asian Women's Club Volleyball Championship
2021 Asian Men's Volleyball Championship

References

Asian Volleyball Club Championship
International volleyball competitions hosted by Thailand
2021 in Thai sport
V